Vlatko Drobarov (born 2 November 1992) is a Macedonian professional footballer who plays as a defender for Bulgarian club Cherno More Varna.

Career

Club
In September 2013, Drobarov moved to Liga Premier de México club Murciélagos. He was part of the ranks of A PFG club Cherno More between October 2020 and June 2022.

Career statistics

Club

Honours

Club
Teteks
Macedonian Cup: 2012–13

Banants
 Armenian Cup: 2015–16

Notes

External links
 
 
 Indian Super League stats - Indian Super League

1992 births
Living people
Footballers from Skopje
Association football central defenders
Macedonian footballers
North Macedonia youth international footballers
FK Skopje players
FK Napredok players
FK Teteks players
Murciélagos FC footballers
FC Urartu players
Aris Limassol FC players
Ohod Club players
FK Belasica players
Kerala Blasters FC players
PFC Cherno More Varna players
FK Sarajevo players
Macedonian First Football League players
Liga Premier de México players
Armenian Premier League players
Cypriot First Division players
Indian Super League players
First Professional Football League (Bulgaria) players
Premier League of Bosnia and Herzegovina players
Macedonian expatriate footballers
Expatriate footballers in Mexico
Expatriate footballers in Armenia
Macedonian expatriate sportspeople in Armenia
Expatriate footballers in Cyprus
Macedonian expatriate sportspeople in Cyprus
Expatriate footballers in India
Macedonian expatriate sportspeople in India
Expatriate footballers in Bulgaria
Macedonian expatriate sportspeople in Bulgaria